The western tree frog is a species of frog in the family Rhacophoridae endemic to India.

Western tree frog may also refer to:

 Western Andes tree frog, a frog endemic to Colombia
 Western green tree frog, a frog found in Southwest Australia
 Western Highland tree frog, a frog found in Indonesia and Papua New Guinea

Animal common name disambiguation pages